The Natal Championships later known as the Natal Open was a men's and women's grass court tennis tournament held at Pietermaritzburg or Durban, KwaZulu-Natal, South Africa 1884 through 2005.

History
The Natal Championships were founded in 1884 and first staged Pietermaritzburg, KwaZulu-Natal, South Africa. In 1885 it was then first staged at Durban then tournament alternated between both locations. In 1968 at the start of the Open era in tennis its title changed to the Natal Open for men which was the ATP Event and the Natal Open Championships for women which was a WTA Event in 1968.  The event was staged at Umhlali during the final four years of the women's event. In later years the tournament had switched to hard courts. The event was usually run between the middle two weeks of July each year.

References

Grass court tennis tournaments
Hard court tennis tournaments
Defunct tennis tournaments in South Africa